Gary Chapman (born 1 May 1964) is an English former professional footballer who played as a striker.

Career
Born in Bradford, Chapman played for Frickley Athletic, Bradford City, Notts County, Mansfield Town, Exeter City, Torquay United, Darlington and Emley.

References

1964 births
Living people
English footballers
Frickley Athletic F.C. players
Bradford City A.F.C. players
Notts County F.C. players
Mansfield Town F.C. players
Exeter City F.C. players
Torquay United F.C. players
Darlington F.C. players
Wakefield F.C. players
English Football League players
Association football forwards